Shin (born Su Chien-hsin on 14 May 1971) is a Taiwanese singer, songwriter and actor. He is known as the former lead singer of the rock band Shin and a Golden Melody Awards nominee for Best Mandarin Male Singer.

Shin had been singing in pubs for around ten years before becoming a singer. He formed a band with Chris, Michael, Max and Tomi during his pub singing days. They debuted their self-titled album Shin (信樂團同名專輯) in May 2002. On 20 March 2007, he left the band and started his solo career.

Musical style and vocal characteristics
Xin is noted for his wide vocal range and extremely powerful voice which is rare in Mandopop. Shin is also renowned for his high screams while singing rock songs. He got the public attention by singing Scorpions's Still Loving You and other foreign rock band's songs in Harlem Yu's show 音樂大不同. He became popular in mainland China by the song 死了都要愛

Shin's musical style includes Heavy metal, hard rock, pop rock and mandopop in which he mainly sings Hard Rock. He also tried other music genres like nu metal, progressive rock and Britpop in songs such as 再見, 頑強 and 英國的夏天.

Solo career

我就是我 (I'm Just Me) (2007-2008)
After leaving the band, in September 2007, Shin released his debut solo album, titled 我就是我. In 2008, he was nominated for Best Mandarin Male Singer at the 19th Golden Melody Awards.

On 21 December 2007, Shin began his debut solo concert tour Starting from Shin: I Am Me (從信開始 我就是我) in Nanjing Olympic Sports Center, where he performed the track "Shut Up" with guest Taiwanese artist Will Pan, which was released in Pan's sixth studio album Play It Cool under label Universal Music Taiwan. The tour continued onto Beijing Workers' Gymnasium and Shanghai Indoor Stadium.

Shin sang a duet "需要你的愛" (Need Your Love) with Taiwanese band F.I.R., which was released on their fourth album Love · Diva.

集樂星球 (Take Me To the Stars) (2008-2009)
集樂星球 debuted at #3 in G-music Mandarin Chart in week 43, which is also the highest rank of this album.

On 23 May 2009, Shin played a concert in Capital Indoor Stadium titled "Febia 晶銳集樂星球演唱會".

趁我 (While I) (2009-2011)
趁我 is the first commercial success of Shin in Taiwan since his solo career. The album debuted at #3 on G-music Mandarin Chart and hit #1 on G-music Mandarin Chart on week 48.

火燒的寂寞 (The Lonely Fire) and 趁我 (While I) became a hit in both Mainland China and Taiwan. 火燒的寂寞 (The Lonely Fire) was awarded for Most Favourite Mandarin Song at TVB JSG Season's Award.

On 27 August 2010, Shin made an appearance in Back to Basic-Rock Stars Concert (Beijing) (怒放搖滾英雄演唱會北京站).

On 25 September, Shin held a concert with Taiwan singer A-Lin at Club Nokia in Los Angeles.

On 29 November, the single 降龍樂章(Dragon Movement) was released. The song was endorsed for a Mainland online game 降龍之劍 (Dragon Sword).

黎明之前 (Before The Dawn) (2011-2012)
Shin released his fourth album on 22 July 2011. The album debuted at #1 on 5music Mandarin Chart.
The music video of the first single, Before the Dawn (黎明之前), was directed by 比爾賈, with Taiwan famous artist Barbie Shu as the main actress. However, the music video is banned from broadcasting in Taiwan because of its violence and bloody content.

On 23 September 2011, Shin and A-Lin held a concert titled "One Night in Melbourne" at Dallas Brooks Centre.

On 24 December 2011, Shin held a small concert in Shanghai at Shanghai International Gymnastic Center.

Shin won the Best Male Singer(Taiwan/Hong Kong) in Sprite Music Award. The song Before The Dawn won the Best Song of the Year.

On 6 April 2012, Shin released Before The Dawn (Audio-visual collection). This album includes 5 music videos, 6 live performances and a video of making the album.

On 21 April 2012, Shin started his tour titled "信無畏搖滾巡迴演唱會" (Shin Fearless Rock Tour) in Taipei at Taipei Arena with Anna Tsuchiya and A-Lin as guests.
This is the first time that Shin held a concert at Taipei Arena.
It is announced that the tour will come to Beijing and Shanghai in November 2012.

我記得 (I Remember) (2012–2014)
One of the song from this album, "Embrace in Strong Wind" (狂風裡擁抱) was performed in Shin's concert in Taipei Arena with A-Lin. The Music Video of the duet was released on 7 August. This song soon became a hit in KTV.

On 1 and 16 September, Shin participated in Bloom of Youth rock tour (怒放青春巡迴演唱會) Shenzhen and Quanzhou stations.

On 7 September 2012, Shin released his fifth studio album I Remember. Differing from the past, I Remember is not a rock album. Most of the songs in it are pop love songs. Shin sang softly in this album, unlike the usual.

Shin released his first Cantonese song 太 (a Cantonese version of 我選擇笑) in I Remember (edited version). Shin also remade his famous song 天高地厚 in the edited version.

On 9 July 2014, Shin ended his 12 years relationship with Avex Taiwan and signed a new contract with HIM International Music which allowed him to have more freedom and control in producing his own music.

反正我信了 (Whatever, I Just Believe In) (2015-2016) 
On 6 March 2015, Shin released the first album 反正我信了(Whatever, I Just Believe In) after signing with HIM International Music.

In 2016 January, Shin participated in Mainland China's singing competition programme I Am a Singer (season 4) and was eliminated in episode 6 despite his impressive performance in attempting alternative songs that are rarely sung in music programmes. He received much respect from the Chinese audience because of his innovative style and courage. He gained a large fan base in China despite his early loss.

大爺們 (Welcome to My World) (2016-present) 
On 8 December 2016, Shin announced that he will start a new world tour named "信GentleMonster 2017巡回演唱會" (Shin Gentle Monster 2017 Tour) in 2017  and the first concert will be on 20 May 2017 in Taipei Arena. The tour is said to include at least ten cities in Mainland China and Taiwan and potential stations in Malaysia, Singapore and the United States.

On 30 December 2016, the eighth solo studio album 大爺們 (Welcome to My World) was released.

On 19 May 2017, one day before his concert in Taipei Arena, Shin released his greatest hits album SHIN: BEST OF BEST celebrating his 15th Anniversary.

Discography

Solo albums

Shin band albums

Hit singles

2002:《死了都要愛》
2002:《一了百了》
2002:《世界末日》
2002:《One Night In 北京》
2003:《離歌》
2003:《天高地厚》
2004:《千年之戀》
2004:《海闊天空》
2004:《假如》

2007:《我恨你》
2007:《傷城》
2008:《告別的時代》
2009:《火燒的寂寞》
2009:《趁我》
2011:《黎明之前》
2011:《假裝陽光的蠟燭》
2011:《遠得要命的愛情》
2012:《狂風裡擁抱》
2012:《暗藏後悔》

2015: 如果你還在就好了
2015: 反正我信了
2015: 冷火
2016: 掌紋算命
2016: 唱不完的副歌

Soundtrack contributions

Filmography

Film and television
 死了都要愛 - starring role
 At the Dolphin Bay (海豚灣戀人) - cameo
 Westside Story (西街少年) - Chris, Tomi and Shin cameo
2007: Summer x Summer (熱情仲夏) as Sean
2008 Honey & Clover (蜂蜜幸運草) as 任以薰
2012: 賽車傳奇 as 林司哲
2013: Love Retake (愛情不NG) as 鄭直
2013: Micro Film 18歲的勇氣 as 信
2013: Miro Film 反核 卡到天王篇 as Toy store owner
2014: Go, Single Lady 上流俗女 as  何偉成
2017: 笑林足球 as 森

Variety and reality show
2016: Singer (season 4)
2022: Call Me by Fire (season 2)

Awards and nominations

References

External links
  Shin@Avex Taiwan 2010 official website
  Shin discography@Avex Taiwan

Living people
Taiwanese Mandopop singer-songwriters
1971 births
21st-century Taiwanese male singers